Philip John Lee (6 May 1944 – 6 March 2010) was an English virtuoso flamenco guitarist, born in Norwich. At school he taught himself the mandolin, and at age 14 began classical guitar lessons. The following year he first heard flamenco, and decided to become a flamenco guitarist, devoting himself to its study for the next four years. At age 15 he built himself a classical guitar.

Early career
In the early 1960s he went to Spain, initially to Seville, where musicians were still hired unconventionally, paid according to how much they pleased the guests, but they were normally all Spanish. In an interview, he described how the gitano (Romani) musicians let him sit in on such occasions, astonished that he never asked for payment, yet he often did most of the playing. He describes his influences as the more orthodox flamenco guitarists, such as Ramón Montoya and Sabicas. He was the first English guitarist to win such acceptance.

Career in the UK
He gave many recitals in Britain, including the Wigmore Hall and the Purcell Room, as well as performances on radio and television. In 1969 he released an album, "Flamenco Guitar", on the now defunct Music for Pleasure label, recorded with engineer John Boyden in Conway Hall using a pair of AKG microphones and a Revox tape recorded at 15ips. It was a best seller, selling over a quarter of a million copies.

Later career
Over the following years he went on to record several other albums. In 1989 he moved to the United States where he lived and performed in Los Angeles for ten years. In 1999 he published an album entitled The LA Concert.

In that year he returned to England, to live in West London, where he gave lessons to many pupils. Many other modern guitarists have given renderings of his pieces, and he is now being discovered by younger players.

Philip John Lee died on 3 March 2010, aged 64. Following his death, Classical Guitar magazine published a six-page compilation of tributes to his career, including a long memoir by Paco Peña.

Discography

References

External links
 Discography at Discogs
 Philip John Lee at the Ealing Guitar Society

1944 births
2010 deaths
English male guitarists
Flamenco guitarists
Musicians from Norwich